Vareje is a small settlement in the Municipality of Divača in the Littoral region of Slovenia.

References

External links
Vareje on Geopedia

Populated places in the Municipality of Divača